Jamie Beadsworth (born 11 June 1985) is an Australian water polo player who competed in the 2008 and 2012 Summer Olympics.
Jamie had a stroke April 1, 2011 after being kicked in the neck accidentally at a National Water Polo League game. Jamie claimed to feel a little uneasy and assumed he was concuss so his partner Leah drove him straight from the game to hospital where neurosurgeons determined he had in fact suffered a stroke. With no preexisting conditions or family history of heart failure/issues, the stroke was dubbed a freak accident, Beadssworth stating, "I was more concerned that my health was 100 per cent rather than (about) my water polo future,".

Competing in the 2008 Summer Olympics ranking 8th and again in the 2012 Summer Olympics ranking 7th.

References

External links
 

Foreman. G, 17/6/12. Jamie Beadsworth is London bound after overcoming a stroke. The Sunday Telegraph.

1985 births
Living people
Australian male water polo players
Olympic water polo players of Australia
Water polo players at the 2008 Summer Olympics
Water polo players at the 2012 Summer Olympics